Enthesophytes are abnormal bony projections at the attachment of a tendon or ligament. They are not to be confused with osteophytes, which are abnormal bony projections in joint spaces. Enthesophytes and osteophytes are bone responses for stress.

References 

Musculoskeletal disorders